Sir Archibald Denny, 1st Baronet FRSE LLD (1860–1935), was a Scottish naval architect who was owner of the huge Clyde shipbuilding company of William Denny and Brothers and was granted a baronetcy in 1913, thereby giving birth to the Denny baronets of Dumbarton. Unusually as an owner, he also interested himself directly in the design of ships. He was president of the Institute of Marine Engineers. The company, usually simply referred to as Dennys, had the highest output and tonnage of any of the Clyde shipbuilders, ranking them as one of the world’s largest companies at that time.

Glasgow University award an Archibald Denny Prize annually to the best Naval Architecture student. This was granted in 1912 during Denny's lifetime, and the prize includes money intended for foreign travel.

Life

Denny was born on 7 February 1860, the fourth son of Peter Denny FRSE of Denny Brothers, shipbuilders in Dumbarton, and his wife Helen Leslie. The family was enormously rich being involved in the then (19th century) very safe industry of shipbuilding. His early education was at Dumbarton Burgh School. In 1874 he was sent to Lausanne in Switzerland to complete his education at a private school.

Unlike his brothers, Archibald felt a need to stimulate his mind, whilst still involving himself in the family business. He therefore went to London to engage in specific training as a naval architect at the Royal Naval College, Greenwich. This brought a "hands-on" relationship between shipyard owner and design. He brought a practicality to designs, often absent in competitors, setting them up well for the more commercial elements of ship design. The Oxford Dictionary of National Biography summarised this as "technical excellence".

In 1883 the ownership of the family shipbuilders passed to Archibald (aged only 23). In the same year Archibald took over the shipyard in Leven, Fife, and introduced the world’s first hydromechanical experimentation laboratory: including a large tank for testing the properties of model ships. In 1885 he brought in John Ward to assist in the management, and in 1895 a cousin, Col Leslie Denny. Under Archibald’s control the company began to specialise in ferries and refrigerated ships (Reefer ships). In 1905 the company further broadening seeking and gaining lucrative Admiralty contracts for torpedo-boats, submarines, destroyers and hospital ships. One branch of the company also began building military fighter aircraft.

In 1894 he was elected a fellow of the Royal Society of Edinburgh. His proposers were John Henderson, Sir John Murray, Alexander Buchan, and Alexander Crum Brown. He was awarded honorary doctorates (LLD) from both Glasgow University (in 1911) and Cambridge University (in 1927). He was created First Baron of Dumbarton in 1913. He was a keen military volunteer and rose to the rank of lieutenant colonel in first the Dunbartonshire Volunteers then the Argyll and Sutherland Highlanders.

From 1903 to 1905 Denny was president of the Institution of Engineers and Shipbuilders in Scotland. In 1912 he was appointed onto the investigatory committee set up by the Board of Trade on the Titanic disaster which had sent shock waves through the shipbuilding world. The committee did not reach any final conclusions until 1915. He thereafter represented Britain at the International Conference on the Safety of Life at Sea.

In 1918 the company became a limited company, William Denny and Brothers Ltd. After a slight dip in orders from 1920 to 1923, things revived with further work from the Admiralty and from Canadian Pacific. Commercial production drifted from ferries to cargo-liners.

In 1921 he moved to London to look after the company’s shipping interests in that city.
He died in London on 29 May 1935.

Family

He was married to Margaret Tulloch, daughter of John Tulloch, in 1885. They lived at Braehead House in Dumbarton. They had five sons and one daughter.

Their eldest son, Maurice Edward Denny (1886–1965) took partnership in William Denny and Brothers in 1911. On the death of his father Archibald he became  the 2nd Baronet.

Their other children were: William Murray Denny (1887–1914); Eileen Margaret Denny (born 1891); Peter Archibald Denny (1892–1938); James Murray Tulloch Denny (born 1896); and Walter Brock Denny (1898–1902).

Ships built under Archibald Denny
See 

SS Princess Henrietta (1888) (for Belgium)
PS Princess Josephine (1888)
PS Leopold II (1888)
PS Duchess of Hamilton (1890)
PS Princess Victoria (1890) built as the Larne to Stranraer Ferry
PS Princess May built as a sister ship to Victoria due to increased ferry demand (1892)
TSS Duke of York (1894) a ferry serving Fleetwood to Belfast
TSS Seaford (1894) a cross-channel ferry which sunk in 1895
TSS Sussex (1895) to replace the Seaford
TSS Dover (1895)
TSS Calais (1895)
TSS Lord Hamilton (1895)
SS Lord Warden (1896)
PS Walton Belle (1897)
Shamrock I a manganese-bronze yacht for Sir Thomas Lipton launched in 1900
SS Bavarian (1899) a troopship for South Africa as part of the Boer War effort
SY Lystistrata (1900) for the New York newspaper magnate, James Gordon Bennett Jr.
Shamrock II (1900) a lower specification luxury yacht to sister Shamrock I for Sir Thomas Lipton
SS Duchess of Argyll (1906)
SS Sir Trevredyn Wynne a train ferry for the Bengal-Nagpur Railway in India (1909)
TB Lady Inchcape (1909) 
TSS Riviera (1911)
TSS King Edward (1911)
TSS Queen Alexandria (1911)
TSS Brighton (1912) as the Newhaven to Dieppe ferry
TSS Princess Maud (1912) as the Larne to Stranraer ferry
TSS Londonderry (1912) as the Heysham to Belfast ferry
TSS Paris (1913) as a sister ship to TSS Brighton, one of the first ferries to achieve 25 knots
SS Rotomahana (1913) a liner (the first in mild steel)
SS Buenos Ayres (1913) a liner
TSS Scot (1913)
TSS Reva (1913) a troopship bringing troops from India
TSS Otaki (1913) for New Zealand the first merchant ship with turbines
TSS Chinduin (1913)
TSS Infanta Isobel De Barton (1913) for Spain
TSS Loongana (1913) for New Zealand
TSS Queen (1913) channel ferry
TSSs Onward, Invicta, Victoria, and Empress (1914) a fleet of ferries serving the Dover to Calais route
TSS Curraghmore (1920)
TSS Fishbourne (1927) a car ferry
SS Beaverburn (1928)
TSS Canterbury (1929)
MS Loch Fyne (1931)

Arms

References

1860 births
1935 deaths
British shipbuilders
People from Dumbarton
Fellows of the Royal Society of Edinburgh
Presidents of the Institution of Engineers and Shipbuilders in Scotland